Thea Schleusner  (1879-1964) was a German painter.

Biography
Schleusner was born on 30 April 1879 in Wittenberg, Germany. She studied in Paris at the Académie Colarossi and the Académie Moderne. In Germany she studied with Franz Skarbina and Reinhold Lepsius. She settled in Berlin where she painted portraits of Emil Nolde, Albert Einstein, and Friedrich Nietzsche.

Schleusner died in 1964 in Berlin. Her work is in the collection of the Musée d'Orsay.

References

External links
 
 images of Schleusner's work on Artnet

1879 births
1964 deaths
People from Wittenberg
20th-century German women artists